Felicity is an American drama television series created by J. J. Abrams & Matt Reeves. Abrams and Reeves share executive producer duties with Brian Grazer, Tony Krantz, Jennifer Levin, Ron Howard, John Eisendrath & Laurie McCarthy. It was produced by Touchstone Television (now known as ABC Signature) and Imagine Television. The series first aired on September 29, 1998, and ended on May 22, 2002 after four seasons on The WB.

The series revolves around the fictional college experiences of the title character, Felicity Porter (portrayed by Keri Russell), as she attends the "University of New York" (based on New York University). While Felicity works to sort out her emotions, she continues the basic motions of student life and moves into her dorm. There, she meets the resident advisor Noel Crane (Scott Foley). Eventually, romance ensues, and the relationships among Felicity, Ben, and Noel form the basic dramatic conflicts in the show throughout the series.

A number of other characters appear and play large roles in Felicity's life, including her close-knit group of roommates and friends. A recurring episode opener of the show is a stark camera shot of Felicity sitting in a dormitory room or apartment holding a tape recorder, recalling events in order to make a cassette tape to send to an old friend named Sally Reardon (voiced by Janeane Garofalo). This occasionally provides a method for Felicity to narrate an entire episode. At the end of episodes like this, Felicity is often shown to be listening to a tape that Sally has sent in reply.

In 2007, Felicity was one of Time magazine's "100 Best TV Shows of All-Time." AOL TV named Felicity one of the "Best School Shows of All Time." In June 2010, Entertainment Weekly named Felicity Porter one of the "100 Greatest Characters of the Last 20 Years".

Over the course of four seasons, Felicity aired a total of 84 episodes. Each season corresponds to the traditional American university divisions of freshman, sophomore, junior, and senior years.

Series overview

Episodes

Season 1 (1998–1999)

Season 2 (1999–2000)

Season 3 (2000–2001)

Season 4 (2001–2002)

References

External links
 Episode list for Felicity
 

Lists of American teen drama television series episodes